Christopher Bratton is an American educator, administrator, the former president of School of the Museum of Fine Arts, Boston, and former deputy director of Museum of Fine Arts, Boston. Prior, he had served as the president of San Francisco Art Institute (2004–2010), and dean of undergraduate studies, chair and professor of the film and video departments at the School of the Art Institute of Chicago (1993–2004).

He also is a co-founder of Video Machete, a community-based arts and media project in Chicago.

Bratton obtained his M.F.A. in film from University of Wisconsin–Milwaukee Peck School of the Arts.

References

San Francisco Art Institute faculty
University of Wisconsin–Milwaukee alumni
Living people
Heads of universities and colleges in the United States
Year of birth missing (living people)